The 2017 IHF Super Globe was the eleventh edition of the tournament. It was held in Doha, Qatar at the Duhail Handball Sports Hall from 25 to 28 August 2017.

Barcelona captured their third title after a 29–25 final win over Berlin.

Teams
The best club of each continent through their tournaments, a host team and a wild card team participated.

Referees
The following Referee pairs were selected for the tournament.

Results
All times are local (UTC+3).

Bracket

5th place bracket

Quarterfinals

5–8th place semifinals

Semifinals

Seventh place game

Fifth place game

Third place game

Final

Final ranking

References

External links
Official website

IHF Super Globe
2017
IHF Super Globe
2017 IHF Super Globe
Sports competitions in Doha
IHF Super Globe